More Sing Along with Mitch is an album by Mitch Miller & The Gang. It was released in 1958 on the Columbia label (catalog no. CL-1243).

The album debuted on Billboard magazine's popular albums chart on November 10, 1958, peaked at No. 4, and remained on that chart for 117 weeks. It was certified as a gold record by the RIAA.

Track listing
Side 1
 "Medley: "Pretty Baby" and "By My Little Baby Bumble Bee"
 Medley: "Sweet Adeline" and "Let Me Call You Sweetheart"
 "Moonlight and Roses"
 "If You Were the Only Girl"
 "Buddy"
 "The Whiffenpoof Song (Baa! Baa! Baa!)"

Side 2
 "Carolina in the Morning"
 Irish Medley: "When Irish Eyes Are Smiling" and "My Wild Irish Rose"
 Medley: "Shine on Harvest Moon" and "For Me and My Gal"
 "You Tell Me Your Dream, I'll Tell You Mine"
 "There's a Long Trail"
 "In the Evening by the Moonlight"

References

1958 albums
Columbia Records albums
Mitch Miller albums